John Adie (born 2 March 1930) is a Scottish former footballer who played as a left-back. Adie began his career in the late 1940s with Heart of Midlothian, spending seven years with the Tynecastle side before moving back to Fife with East Fife. The defender spent three years at Bayview Park before having a short spell in 1958 with Dundee United, making his debut in August of that year. A couple of months later, Adie lost his first-team place and appears to have been released shortly after.

References

External links
 

1930 births
Living people
Footballers from Fife
Scottish footballers
Scottish Football League players
Heart of Midlothian F.C. players
East Fife F.C. players
Dundee United F.C. players
Association football fullbacks